Aethes decimana is a species of moth of the family Tortricidae. It was described by Michael Denis and Ignaz Schiffermüller in 1775.

Distribution
This species can be found in Spain, France, Germany, Italy, Austria, Switzerland, Slovakia, Slovenia, Poland, Romania and Ukraine.

Habitat

Description
The basic color of the wings is brown, with large yellow markings. Adults are on wing from July to August.

References

External links

Delta-intkey

decimana
Moths described in 1775
Moths of Europe
Taxa named by Michael Denis
Taxa named by Ignaz Schiffermüller